Nanyang Siang Pau or Nanyang Business Daily was founded by philanthropist-entrepreneur Tan Kah Kee on 6 September 1923 in Straits Settlements, currently published in Malaysia. Nanyang Siang Pau is one of the oldest Chinese-language newspapers in the country, with only Kwong Wah Yit Poh having been published longer. It has been published continuously except for four months in 1923 and 1924 and during the World War II between 1942 and 1945, before publication resumed on 8 September 1945.

History
On 6 September 1923, Tan Kah Kee founded Nanyang Siang Pau in the Straits Settlements.

During the Japanese invasion of Manchuria in 1931, Nanyang Siang Pau started Sunday publications from 20 December 1931 to report on the war. The special edition was later named the "Sunday Edition".

The newspaper first ventured into Kuala Lumpur in 1958, but the newspaper remains printed in Singapore. In 1962, the headquarters of Nanyang Siang Pau moved to Kuala Lumpur, first with Jalan Travers, Brickfields and followed by Jalan Bangsar in 1972.

The Singapore edition of the paper has merged with Sin Chew Jit Poh on March 16, 1983, to form the current Lianhe Zaobao.

In August 1932, the Nanyang Daily was separated from Tan's company. The newspaper company name was changed to Nanyang Press in 1975. In 1993, Nanyang Press took over the management of another Chinese daily, China Press and a year later, its office moved to Section 7, Petaling Jaya, its current location.

Nanyang had its initial public offering (IPO) in 1989, the first Chinese daily to be listed in Bursa Malaysia. Until the late 1980s, it was Malaysia's highest-selling Chinese newspaper, before being overtaken by Sin Chew Daily, which is also the highest-selling Chinese newspaper outside of Hong Kong, Mainland China and Taiwan.

On 28 May 2001, Huaren Holdings, the investment arm of the political party MCA, bought over Nanyang Press, in a controversial transaction that led to mass boycotts of the newspaper by the Chinese community.

By June 2005, Nanyang has raised more than RM240 million for Chinese education in Malaysia, through its Top Ten charity concerts in conjunction with Carlsberg Malaysia.

in 2006, Huaren Holdings disposed 21.02% of its share to Ezywood Options Sdn Bhd, a company owned by Tan Sri Tiong Hiew King. Huaren's remaining stake were exchanged for a share in Media Chinese International Ltd (MCIL) in 2008, but then disposed of its entire holding in MCIL in 2010.

See also 
 Other Chinese language newspapers in Malaysia:
 China Press, its sister publication
 Guang Ming Daily
 Kwong Wah Yit Poh
 Sin Chew Daily
 Oriental Daily News
 Related newspaper
 Nanyang Siang Pau, former Singaporean edition, merged with Sin Chew Jit Poh to form Lianhe Zaobao in 1983

References

External links 
 Nanyang Siang Pau 南洋商报 (eNanyang)

1923 establishments in Singapore
Newspapers published in Malaysia
Newspapers established in 1923
Chinese-language newspapers (Simplified Chinese)
Mass media in Petaling Jaya
Chinese-language mass media in Malaysia
Malaysian Chinese Association